Mainland Cheese is a brand of cheese owned by Fonterra Co-operative Group that is sold throughout Australasia and parts of the Americas. It began as a family business in the South Island of New Zealand (which is jocularly known as the "mainland" of New Zealand because it is larger than the North Island).

Company history

Mainland Products Ltd was founded in 1954 by Peter McConnon. It grew rapidly, encompassing fresh and processed milk, cheese (with which the company's name is most associated today) as well as ice cream (Tip Top), processed meats (Kiwi Huttons) and other consumer foods.  Kiwi Co-operative Dairies led by CEO Craig Norgate acquired 83% of the business in the 1990s. The balance was acquired by Fonterra (formed by a 2001 merger which included Kiwi Co-op), also led by Norgate, in 2002.

In 2005, Fonterra sold most of the business that was formerly part of Mainland to Graeme Hart's Rank Group Ltd, but it retained all the cheese assets.  Mainland cheese now comes under Fonterra Brands.  The balance of the former Mainland company is now part of Goodman Fielder. Mainland remained a family owned and operated business, with Peter's sons Baird and Alan along with grandson Simon McConnon, until its sale to Fonterra.

Advertising

Mainland established an iconic advertising campaign. Mainland's advertising in New Zealand has been largely focused on the theme of waiting/patience, mirroring the aging process of cheese.

Mainland's advertising in Australia has been largely focused on playing on the New Zealand accent. For example, "your frind in the frudge" (your friend in the fridge), and confusing the sound of "cheese day" with "Tuesday".

See also 
 Edam (cheese)

References

External links
Mainland Cheddar Cheese U.S.
Mainland at Fonterra
Dairy products companies of New Zealand
New Zealand cheeses
Food and drink companies established in 1954
New Zealand companies established in 1954
Fonterra brands
New Zealand brands